Richard John Graham "Ricky" Panter (born 18 September 1948) is a British Anglican priest. He has been Archdeacon of Liverpool since 2002.

Panter was educated at Monkton Combe School, Worcester College of Education and Oak Hill Theological College. After three years as a teacher he was ordained in 1977. After a curacy at Holy Trinity, Rusholme he was Assistant Vicar at  St Cyprian with Christchurch, Edge Hill.  He was Vicar  of  St Andrews, Clubmoor from 1985 to 1996; and then of St John and St James,  Bootle until 2011.

References

1948 births
Living people
People educated at Monkton Combe School
Archdeacons of Liverpool
Alumni of the University of Worcester
Alumni of Oak Hill College